David Romtvedt is an American poet.

Life
He graduated from Reed College, and the Iowa Writers' Workshop.
He teaches at University of Wyoming. He lives in Buffalo, Wyoming, with his wife, the potter Margo Brown.  His daughter, Caitlin Belem, plays Brazilian and Latin music with the band Maracuja.

His work has appeared in The Sun Magazine, The American Poetry Review, The Paris Review, Ploughshares, Prairie Schooner, The Missouri Review, and the Basque cultural review Erle.

He is a founder and current board member of Worlds of Music. Romtvedt plays button accordion with the band The Fireants. They have recorded three CDs: Bury My Clothes, Ants on Ice and It's Hot. The band plays Latin and Cajun/Zydeco music as well as original music that David Romtvedt has written.

Awards
 1991 National Poetry Series, for A Flower Whose Name I Do Not Know
 Pushcart Prize
 two National Endowment for the Arts Fellowships
 Wyoming Arts Council literature fellowship
 Wyoming Governor's Arts Award.

Works
  Dilemmas of the Angels. Baton Rouge, LA: Louisiana State University Press. 2017. 
 Zelestina Urza in Outer Space. Reno, NV: Center for Basque Studies. University of Nevada. 2015. .
 Buffalotarrak. Reno, NV: Center for Basque Studies. University of Nevada. 2011. .
 
 
 
 
 
 
 . Illustrated by Pat Weyer.
 
 Moon: Poems (1984). St. Paul, MN: Bieler Press. . Illustrated by R W Scholes.

Anthologies

Editor

References

External links
"An E-view with David Romtvedt", Drunken boat
"Windmill: Essays from Four Mile Ranch by David Romtvedt", Wind Works

Year of birth missing (living people)
Living people
American male poets
Reed College alumni
Poets Laureate of Wyoming
People from Buffalo, Wyoming